Bondarchuk is a Ukrainian surname meaning barrel maker. Most famous are the members of the Bondarchuk family who have been influential in Soviet cinema. The surname may refer to:

 Sergei Bondarchuk (1920–1994), actor and film director
 Irina Bondarchuk, née Skobtseva (born 1927), actress; widow of Sergei Bondarchuk
 Anatoliy Bondarchuk (born 1940), Ukrainian hammer thrower
 Natalya Bondarchuk (born 1950), actress and film director, daughter of Sergei Bondarchuk and Inna Makarova
 Yelena Bondarchuk (1962–2009), actress, daughter of actors Sergei Bondarchuk and Irina Skobtseva
 Fyodor Bondarchuk (born 1967), actor and film director, son of Sergei Bondarchuk and Irina Skobtseva
Irina Bondarchuk (born 1952), Russian former long-distance runner

See also
 

 *
Ukrainian-language surnames